Banning is a city in Riverside County, California, United States. The population was 29,505 as of the 2020 census, down from 29,603 at the 2010 census. It is situated in the San Gorgonio Pass, also known as Banning Pass. It is named for Phineas Banning, stagecoach line owner and the "Father of the Port of Los Angeles."

Banning shares geographic and regional features with its western neighbor, the city of Beaumont. Banning and Beaumont have been rapidly growing in size and population since the 1990s. Both cities are about 80 miles east of downtown Los Angeles and 30 miles west of Palm Springs, each connected by freeway and railroad.

History

Etymology

Initially named Moore City, for and by Ransom B. Moore, within only a few months the town was renamed for Phineas Banning, "Father of the Port of Los Angeles". Banning had pastured sheep in the San Gorgonio Pass area, and operated a stagecoach that ran through the Pass.

Early history
The area, up to the mid-19th century, was inhabited by the Cahuilla people, though the region around Banning was originally Maringayam (Serrano), and the Cahuilla expanded into the pass only in historic times. In 1824, the Mission San Gabriel Arcángel established the Rancho San Gorgonio in the pass. The first Anglo to settle in the area was Dr. Isaac Smith in 1853. In 1863, a smallpox epidemic further diminished the Cahuilla. The government created Indian reservations for the Cahuilla in 1877.

The settlement that was to become Banning developed in coincidence  with the start of the Colorado River Gold Rush. The Bradshaw Trail, which passed through the area in 1862, was a wagon road to the gold boomtowns of the Arizona Territory. Gilman's Ranch, north of downtown, served as a station for the stagecoach lines on this road. The railroad followed, passing through the town in 1876. The Southern Pacific (later purchased by Union Pacific) railroad was a major contributor to the area's growth. U.S. Route 99 was built in 1923, followed by U.S. Route 60/70 in 1936, and subsequently Interstate 10.

Banning borders the Morongo Indian Reservation, home to the Morongo Band of Cahuilla (Mission) Indians. Relations with reservation residents have been strained by disputes over water rights. Dorothy Ramon's book Always Believe (published 2000) depicts a Maringayam's views on Banning and reservation life.

Prior to the name Banning, the settlement was called Moore City. Ransom B. Moore operated a large cattle ranch and was later a member of the Los Angeles County Board of Supervisors, settling in the area and nearby San Gorgonio mountains in the early 1860s. Moore sold his holdings and relocated to central Arizona in 1883.

The town of Banning was incorporated on February 6, 1913.

Almond production
In the early 20th century, the area immediately around Banning was considered well fitted to almond culture, and was known as the oldest almond growing district in southern California.

Indian School and cemetery
The St. Boniface Indian Industrial School was opened in 1890, providing vocational education to Cahuilla, Serrano, Luiseño, Kumeyaay, and other American Indians. Bishop Francisco Mora y Borrell authorized the school and  Mother Katharine Drexel provided funding to the Bureau of Catholic Indian Missions for purchase of the land, construction, and operations. Over its history, about 8,000 students attended the school which was demolished in 1974. A small abandoned cemetery remains.

World War II
During World War II, Banning was the site of the 1,000-bed Banning General Hospital. It supported training at the Desert Training Center and was later used as a naval convalescent hospital. The facilities were dismantled in 1948.

In 1942 the citizens of Banning raised funds for the purchase of an M3 Stuart tank to support the war effort. After the war the tank was given to the South African defense force. The tank, named "City of Johannesburg", is preserved at a local museum in Richmond, Natal Province, South Africa.

Geography
Banning is located at  (33.931729, -116.897557).

Banning is traversed by the San Andreas Fault which created the pass in which the city is situated.

Climate
According to the Köppen Climate Classification system, Banning has a warm-summer Mediterranean climate, abbreviated "Csa" on climate maps.

Demographics

2010
The 2010 United States Census reported that Banning had a population of 29,603. The racial makeup of Banning was 19,164 (64.7%) White (43.4% Non-Hispanic White), 2,165 (7.3%) African American, 641 (2.2%) Native American, 1,549 (5.2%) Asian, 39 (0.1%) Pacific Islander, 4,604 (15.6%) from other races, and 1,441 (4.9%) from two or more races. Hispanic or Latino of any race were 12,181 persons (41.1%).

The Census reported that 28,238 people (95.4% of the population) lived in households, 254 (0.9%) lived in non-institutionalized group quarters, and 1,111 (3.8%) were institutionalized.

There were 10,838 households, out of which 3,083 (28.4%) had children under the age of 18 living in them, 5,106 (47.1%) were opposite-sex married couples living together, 1,488 (13.7%) had a female householder with no husband present, 592 (5.5%) had a male householder with no wife present. There were 700 (6.5%) unmarried opposite-sex partnerships, and 75 (0.7%) same-sex married couples or partnerships. 3,092 households (28.5%) were made up of individuals, and 2,085 (19.2%) had someone living alone who was 65 years of age or older. The average household size was 2.61. There were 7,186 families (66.3% of all households); the average family size was 3.19.

The population was spread out, with 6,777 people (22.9%) under the age of 18, 2,730 people (9.2%) aged 18 to 24, 6,048 people (20.4%) aged 25 to 44, 6,387 people (21.6%) aged 45 to 64, and 7,661 people (25.9%) who were 65 years of age or older. The median age was 42.3 years. For every 100 females, there were 93.4 males.  For every 100 females age 18 and over, there were 90.7 males.

The homeowner vacancy rate was 4.1%; the rental vacancy rate was 10.9%. 17,552 people (59.3% of the population) lived in owner-occupied housing units and 10,686 people (36.1%) lived in rental housing units.

According to the 2010 United States Census, Banning had a median household income of $38,919, with 19.4% of the population living below the federal poverty line.

2000
As of the census of 2000, there were 23,562 people, 8,923 households, and 6,237 families residing in the city. The racial makeup of the city was 64.2% White, 8.6% Black or African American, 2.5% Native American, 5.4% Asian, 0.1% Pacific Islander, 14.9% from other races, and 4.9% from two or more races. 30.2% of the population were Hispanic or Latino of any race.

There were 8,923 households, out of which 26.3% had children under the age of 18 living with them, 53.2% were married couples living together, 12.5% had a female householder with no husband present, and 30.1% were non-families. 25.8% of all households were made up of individuals, and 16.1% had someone living alone who was 65 years of age or older. The average household size was 2.60 and the average family size was 3.11.

In the city, the population was spread out, with 26.4% under the age of 18, 7.4% from 18 to 24, 20.9% from 25 to 44, 18.4% from 45 to 64, and 26.8% who were 65 years of age or older. The median age was 41 years. For every 100 females, there were 90.9 males. For every 100 females age 18 and over, there were 86.7 males.

The median income for a household in the city was $32,076, and the median income for a family was $38,995. Males had a median income of $31,300 versus $20,794 for females. The per capita income for the city was $16,231. About 14.8% of families and 19.9% of the population were below the poverty line, including 31.8% of those under age 18 and 6.5% of those age 65 or over.

Arts and culture

Events
Banning Stagecoach Days has been held annually since 1957 in recognition of the city's historic ties to the original stagecoach line that passed through the area in the late 1800s, and because the city's namesake, Phineas Banning, was himself a stagecoach operator.  Currently, each year the event is operated by the non-profit "Stagecoach Days Association", and held at the AC Dysart Equestrian Park in Banning.

Points of Interest
 Gilman Ranch Historic Park
 Gilman Historic Ranch and Wagon Museum

Government

City
Banning is a general law city as opposed to a charter city. The elected government consists of the Banning City Council which operates under a council-manager government. The current mayor is Colleen Wallace. There are 5 city council districts. The current manager is Douglas Schulze.

The city has departments and appointed officers, including the Banning Police Department (BPD).

Federal and state representation

Public services

Safety
Banning has had its own police force since shortly after its 1913 incorporation, and for many years also had a regional station of the Riverside County Sheriff's Department (which has moved eastward to neighboring Cabazon). The Beaumont, Palm Springs, Cathedral City, and Desert Hot Springs Police Departments also provide assistance in a major emergency, as well as the California Highway Patrol out of the Beaumont regional station.

The city of Banning contracts for fire and paramedic services with the Riverside County Fire Department through a cooperative agreement with CAL FIRE.

Education
The city is served by the Banning Unified School District and nearby Beaumont has the Beaumont Unified School District, both districts serve the area.  Schools in the Banning USD are:

 Banning High School
 Cabazon Elementary
 Central Elementary
 Coombs Alternative Education
 Hemmerling Elementary
 Hoffer Elementary
 New Horizons High (Independent Studies)
 Nicolet Middle

The city is served by Mt. San Jacinto College, a regional community college whose San Gorgonio Pass Campus is located within the city.

Transportation
Banning is served by Interstate 10, which connects the city to Los Angeles in the west and the Coachella Valley in the east. The northern terminus of State Route 243, which runs south to Idyllwild and Mountain Center, is located in the city.

City-owned Banning Municipal Airport, FAA designator: BNG, has a  runway.

City-owned Pass Transit operates three fixed-route buses. SunLine Transit Agency provides service to Palm Desert and Riverside. Riverside Transit Agency provides connecting service to Hemet and Moreno Valley.

Health care
San Gorgonio Memorial Hospital is a General Acute Care Hospital in Banning with Basic Emergency Services as of 2005.

Cemetery
The Summit Cemetery District operates the San Gorgonio Memorial Park, which was originally established in 1931 as the Banning-Cabazon Cemetery District. Notable burials include Medal of Honor recipient William Powers Morris.

Library
The Banning Library District operates the Banning Public Library, which was established in 1916 as the Banning Unified School District Library District and became an independent special district in 2005.

In popular culture
 The protagonist in the 1950 film noir D.O.A.  Frank Bigelow, played by Edmond O'Brien, is an accountant and notary from Banning.
 Location shooting for the films Buckshot John (1915), Fatherhood (1915), Tell Them Willie Boy Is Here (1969),  Sky Below, Crowd Above: The Art Scholl Story (1984), How to Make an American Quilt (1995), Follow Me Home (1996) and Evil on Queen Street (2002) took place in Banning.
 Willie Boy: A Desert Manhunt, was a 1960 novel written by Harry Lawton, and subsequently made into the film Tell Them Willie Boy Is Here, starring Robert Redford and Robert Blake.  The book and movie were based on the true story of the manhunt for the fugitive Willie Boy, a Paiute Indian who killed the father of Lola, the woman he wished to marry. Much of the story is centered around the historic Gilman Ranch located in Banning.

Notable residents
 Johnny Longden
 Sally Sweetland
 Earl Palmer
 John Doucette

References

Further reading

External links

 
 

 
Cities in Riverside County, California
Incorporated cities and towns in California
Populated places established in 1913
Bradshaw Trail
1913 establishments in California